The 1955 Southern Jaguars football team was an American football team that represented Southern University in the Southwestern Athletic Conference (SWAC) during the 1955 college football season. In their 20th season under head coach Ace Mumford, the Jaguars compiled a 7–2–1 record, won the SWAC championship, and were ranked No. 5 in the final Pittsburgh Courier rankings of black college football teams.

Schedule

References

Southern
Southern Jaguars football seasons
Southwestern Athletic Conference football champion seasons
Southern Jaguars football